Davit Khutsishvili (born 19 October 1990, in Sagarejo) is a Georgian freestyle wrestler. He competed in the freestyle 74 kg event at the 2012 Summer Olympics; after defeating Pürevjavyn Önörbat in the qualifications and Augusto Midana in the 1/8 finals, he was eliminated by Denis Tsargush in the quarterfinals.

References

1990 births
Living people
Male sport wrestlers from Georgia (country)
Olympic wrestlers of Georgia (country)
Wrestlers at the 2012 Summer Olympics
People from Kakheti
21st-century people from Georgia (country)